2017 Vegalta Sendai season.

J1 League

J.League Cup 

*

Honours

Indivitual 
 Monthly Best Goal
  Crislan
 TAG Heuer YOUNG GUNS AWARD
  Takuma Nishimura

J.League Cup 

 J.League Cup Award
  Takuma Nishimura
 Top Scorer
  Crislan

Others 

 Fair-Play award
 Vegalta Sendai

References

External links
 J.League official site

Vegalta Sendai
Vegalta Sendai seasons